Sorna District is a district (bakhsh) in Rostam County, Fars Province, Iran. At the 2006 census, its population was 18,631, in 3,538 families.  The District has one city Kupon. The District has two rural districts (dehestan): Poshtkuh-e Rostam Rural District and Rostam-e Seh Rural District.

References 

Rostam County
Districts of Fars Province